The 1983 Australian Sports Car Championship was a CAMS sanctioned motor racing title for drivers of Group A Sports Cars. It was the fifteenth Australian Sports Car Championship.

Peter Hopwood, driving the Steve Webb owned Kaditcha Chevrolet, won the championship from Ray Hanger in a Rennmax Ford. Defending champion Chris Clearihan finished third in his older model Kaditcha Chevrolet.

The 1983 championship saw the debut of the Bap Romano owned and driven Kaditcha K583 Cosworth, the first Australian Group A Sports Car built with a closed top and Ground effects aerodynamics (Clearihan's Kaditcha also appeared with a bolted on closed top in the early rounds of the season but the top was later removed). The K583 would prove to be the fastest car in the field in 1983, and would compete in Class B as the ex-McLaren Cosworth DFV V8 was a 3.0 litre engine. However, unreliability and a disqualification for dangerous driving in Round 4 at Lakeside (Hopwood also received the same penalty at Lakeside) saw Romano only finish sixth in the championship.

After finishing the opening round at Sandown in 2nd place overall and showing that he had the speed to at least match the Kaditcha Chevrolets of Hopwood and Clearihan, the challenge from Tasmanian Johnnie Walker, driving a 1969 model Elfin ME5, ended after the car was sold to a NSW based enthusiast following the opening round. The car was parked and neither it nor Walker took any further part in the series. Another potential challenger was the Mazda 12A rotary powered Tiga SC80 of Adelaide's Richard Warland (the car was driven in later rounds by open wheel driver John Smith). The car proved quick but poor reliability from the Barry Jones built Mazda engine, the cars unnerving habit of shedding rear wheels, plus a big crash by Smith in the final round at Winton put paid to the cars chances.

Calendar
The championship was contested over five rounds with two heats per round.

 Both heats of the Lakeside round were won by Bap Romano from Peter Hopwood, however both drivers were excluded from the round for improper driving.

Classes and points system
Cars were classified into three classes based on engine displacement.
 Class A : Up to 1.6 litres
 Class B : 1.6 to 3 litres
 Class C : Over 3 litres

Points were allocated for outright placings gained in each race with Scale A used for drivers of Class A cars, Scale B for drivers of Class B cars and Scale C for drivers of Class C cars.

A driver's points from both races at each round were aggregated and the result divided by two to arrive at the championship points allocation for the driver at that round.

Championship standings

 The above table lists only the top ten pointscorers.

References

External links
 Sports Cars 1983, www.autopics.com.au
 1983 Australian Sportscar Championship - Rd 4 Lakeside Heat 1, www.youtube.com

Australian Sports Car Championship
Sports Car Championship